Icesis Couture is the stage name of Steven Granados-Portelance (born February 3, 1987), a Canadian drag queen who won the second season of Canada's Drag Race in 2021. He returned to compete in the spin-off series, Canada's Drag Race: Canada vs. the World, in 2022.

Career
Granados-Portelance appeared as Icesis Couture on the second season of the documentary series Canada's a Drag in 2019, and won Ottawa's Miss Capital Pride pageant in 2020.

In 2021, he competed in the second season of Canada's Drag Race, winning two challenges over the course of the season and ultimately winning the competition over finalists Pythia and Kendall Gender. On the night of the Canada's Drag Race finale, all three finalists were at a viewing party at Toronto's Danforth Music Hall, on a bill that also included Icesis's drag daughters Kimmy and Savannah Couture, as well as Makayla Walker Couture, an emerging Toronto drag artist who had appeared in the prom makeover episode as Couture's drag daughter "Ruby Couture". On the same day, Couture released "La Pusetta", a bilingual English and Spanish pop single and music video created in collaboration with DJ and producer Velvet Code under the music label So Fierce Music.

In 2021, Couture modelled the Amsterdam Rainbow Dress, described as "a voluminous multicoloured gown that embodies a powerful statement about the global persecution of LGBTQ people", at Ottawa's National Gallery of Canada.

Personal life
Granados-Portelance is of Salvadoran and French Canadian descent, and lives in Ottawa, Ontario. His younger brother Randy is also a drag queen, who performs under the name Savannah Couture.

He is a close friend of Kiki Coe, a drag performer who was contemporaneously a competitor in the first season of the drag competition series Call Me Mother. Granados-Portelance is also the drag mother of Kimmy Couture, a contestant on the third season of Canada's Drag Race, and Makayla Couture, a contestant on the second season of Call Me Mother who Granados-Portelance put into drag for the makeover challenge of Canada's Drag Race season two.

Filmography

Web series

Discography

Singles

References

External links

 

1987 births
Living people
Canada's Drag Race winners
Canadian drag queens
Canadian people of Salvadoran descent
Franco-Ontarian people
People from Ottawa
21st-century Canadian LGBT people